Willow station may refer to:
__noTOC__

Transportation

Railway 
 Willow Grove station, a SEPTA commuter station in Willow Grove, Pennsylvania
 Willow River station, a railway station in Willow River, British Columbia
 Willow Springs station (Illinois), a Metra commuter station in Willow Springs, Illinois
 Willow Tree railway station, a railway station in New South Wales, Australia
 Willow Tree station (LIRR), a former Long Island Rail Road commuter station in Queens, New York
 Newton-le-Willows railway station, a railway station in Newton-le-Willows, England

Transit 
 Willow (CRT station), a former Chicago Rapid Transit Company station
 Willow station (PAAC), a Port Authority of Allegheny County light rail station in Castle Shannon, Pennsylvania
 Willow Lawn station, a GRTC bus rapid transit station in Richmond, Virginia
 Willow Street station, a Los Angeles County Metro light rail station
 Willow Creek/Southwest 185th Avenue Transit Center, a MAX light rail station and transit center in Hillsboro, Oregon

Military 
 Naval Air Station Joint Reserve Base Willow Grove, a former Naval Air Station in Montgomery County, Pennsylvania
 Willow Run Air Force Station, a former USAF station that was to the east of Willow Run Airport in Michigan

Other 
 Willow (TV channel), an American sports channel devoted to airing overseas cricket events
 Willow Beach Gauging Station, a gauging station in the Lake Mead National Recreation Area, Nevada
 Willow Springs Station, a former Butterfield Overland Mail changing station in Riverside County, California
 Lone Willow Station, a former settlement in Merced County, California